The Rhythm and the Blues is the thirteenth solo studio album by Australian rock musician Jimmy Barnes, released through Liberation Music on 28 August 2009. The album was produced by Don Gehman in Los Angeles and peaked at number one on the Australian Albums Chart for two weeks. The Rhythm and the Blues was Barnes' ninth solo album (thirteenth including his Cold Chisel records) to reach number one on the ARIA Charts, an all-time record for an Australian artist.

The album was touted as a sequel to Barnes' previous works Soul Deep and Soul Deeper... Songs From the Deep South. It features cover versions of tracks from throughout the late 1940s to the 1960s, with songs by the likes of Ray Charles, Little Richard, Ike & Tina Turner, Bo Diddley, Stevie Wonder and Nina Simone.

Track listing
 "Red Hot" (Billy Lee Riley cover)
 "That's Right"
 "Hallelujah I Love Her So" (Ray Charles cover)
 "That's How It Is (When You're in Love)" (Otis Clay cover)
 "Keep a Knocking" (Little Richard cover)
 "Reconsider Me"
 "Shake Rattle & Roll"
 "Rockin' Pneumonia"
 "A Fool in Love" (Ike & Tina Turner cover)
 "You Can't Judge a Book" (Bo Diddley cover)
 "I Was Made to Love Her" (Stevie Wonder cover)
 "Young Blood" (The Coasters cover)
 "My Baby Just Cares for Me" (Nina Simone cover)

Bonus tracks
 "Sea Cruise"

Chart performance

Weekly Performance

Year-end charts

Certifications

Personnel
Jimmy Barnes — Vocals, guitar
Julie Delgardo — Vocals
James Gadson — Drums
Darrell Leonard — Trumpet
Reggie McBride — Bass
Tom Peterson — Saxophone
Joe Sublett - Saxophone
Kennard Ramsey — Vocals
Johnny Lee Schell — Guitar
Mike Thompson — Keyboards
Don Gehman — Producer

See also
 List of number-one albums of 2009 (Australia)

References

Jimmy Barnes albums
2009 albums